Æthelstan: The First King of England is a 2011 biography by Sarah Foot of Æthelstan, who was king of the Anglo-Saxons from 924 to 927 and the first king of the whole of England from 927 to 939.

It includes his family life and his relationships with his numerous half-sisters and half-brothers. It discusses his role during the turbulent time for the kingdoms of Mercia, Wessex and Northumbria.

References

2011 non-fiction books
English-language books
Yale University Press books